Aperschnalzen (Austro-Bavarian Apaschnoizn) is an old tradition of competitive whipcracking revived in the first half of the 20th century in Bavaria and Salzburg. The word "aper" means "area free of snow" in the Bavarian language.

The Aperschnalzen involves the rhythmic snapping and cracking of a whip up to 4 m in length (called "Goassl" in Austro-Bavarian) and takes place at the end of January and early February. It is performed in small groups ("Passen" in Bavarian) of 7, 9 or 11 members each. It has been thought that this tradition had a pagan meaning of "driving the winter away" by whipcracking.

References

  Andrea Euler-Rolle: Zwischen Aperschnalzen und Zwetschkenkrampus. Oberösterreichische Bräuche im Jahreskreis. Landesverlag, 1993. 
 Why Whips Crack

External links

 Homepage Schnalzer Association
 Burschen beim Aperschnalzen (Video)
 The art of whipcracking

Culture of Altbayern
Whip arts